The Santa Ana Parish Church, commonly known as the Piddig Church, is a Roman Catholic parish church in Piddig, Ilocos Norte, Philippines. Originally a visita of Dingras, it was raised into an independent parish in 1770. In September 2014, the 200-year-old church of Saint Anne Parish in Piddig, Ilocos Norte was closed for public worship after it was deemed unsafe.

History
Piddig was originally a visita or mission station of Dingras in 1598. It became an independent parish under the patronage of Saint Anne, Mother of the Blessed Virgin Mary in 1770. Father Isidro Campaner became its first parish priest. The church of Piddig was built also on that same year. During the Philippine–American War, the church was occupied by five-man team of Filipino guerrillas who repulsed early American attacks. It was also razed during the Japanese Occupation. On March 19, 1932, the tower was crippled by an earthquake. The damage was repaired by Monsignor Arsenio Pacis in the same year.

The 21st Infantry of the American forces later occupied the church complex during World War II. Piddig became the military capital of Ilocos Norte. All church records, the convent, sacristy, furniture went up to flames when the Japanese Imperial Forces raided and burned the town. In 1965, restoration work was done in the facade and the interior of the church. The convent now houses the parochial school, Saint Anne Academy, during the term of Father Manuel Aspiras.

Closure

The church was closed for public worship after it was deemed “unsafe” after liturgical rite presided over by Laoag Bishop Renato P. Mayugba on September 14, 2014. According to Father Ericson Josue, the Commission Head of the Church Heritage of the diocese, the foundation of the church has been discovered to be weak to carry the massive walls of the edifice. The local government of Piddig is planning to sought the church to be declared a heritage structure after the National Commission for Culture and the Arts and National Historical Commission of the Philippines. The church was reopened in 2019 after 5 years of renovation.

Features
The church of Piddig is located on top of a hill with a big central stairway, and stone and brick fence. The facade is inspired by the Jesuit Church of Il Gesu in Rome built in 1568. It has huge buttresses that serves as columns and volutes on the pediment. It still has the original wooden pulpit and a central retablo with the image of the patron saint, Saint Anne holding Mary on her lap. Its bell tower is now largely in ruins.

The cemetery at the back of the church, now in ruins, is attributed to Father Felipe Fernandez.

Notes

Bibliography

External links

Roman Catholic churches in Ilocos Norte
Spanish Colonial architecture in the Philippines
Churches in the Roman Catholic Diocese of Laoag